ADCB (formerly Al Karama) is a rapid transit station on the Red Line of the Dubai Metro in Dubai, UAE, serving the Al Karama district. The station is named after the Abu Dhabi Commercial Bank.

The station opened as part of the Red Line on 30 April 2010, originally named Al Karama. It is close to Al Karama Bus Station, Al Attar Shopping Mall, Dubai Central Post Office, the Karama Centre, and the Karama Market. The station is also close to a number of bus routes.

References

External links
 United Arab Emirates, Dubai, Metro ride from ADCB to Burjuman on YouTube

Railway stations in the United Arab Emirates opened in 2010
Dubai Metro stations